Ukhtomsky, alternatively Ukhtomskii, Oechtomski, Ouhtomski, Ukhtomskiy, Ukhtomski, Ukhtomskii, Oukhtomsky, Oukhtomski, Ookhtomsky is a Russian surname of a noble family descended from the Rurik Dynasty, that has been borne by, among others:

Prince Dmitry Ukhtomsky (1719–1774), an architect.
Prince Esper Ukhtomsky (1861–1921), an orientalist, poet, and courtier. Also served as an adviser to Tsar Nicholas II.
 Alexei Alexeyevich Ukhtomsky, (1875–1942), a Russian physiologist
 Prince Pavel Petrovich Ukhtomsky (1849-1910), Vice Admiral in the Imperial Russian Navy
 Prince Fyodor Ukhtomsky (1877—1934), a carrier officer, took part in the World War I, in the Russian Civil War and in anti-Soviet activities from Harbin.
 Princess  Alla Ukhtomsky (1904—1976), the first daughter of Prince Fyodor Ukhtomsky.
 Princess Kira Ukhtomsky, (1906—1971), the second daughter of Prince Fyodor Ukhtomsky.
 Princess Nonna Ukhtomsky, (1910—1954), the third daughter of Prince Fyodor Ukhtomsky.